The 1989 Denver Dynamite season was the second season for the Denver Dynamite. The franchise was restarted in 1989 after sitting out the 1988 season, with the ownership purchased by Englewood, Colorado investment banker, Gary Graham for $125,000. Graham's first move was to hire former NFL and AFL coach Babe Parilli as the team's head coach. The team struggled to earn money during the 1989 season due to only hosting one home game. The team finished with a 3–1 regular season record, and lost in the first round of the playoffs, 37–39 to the Gladiators.

Regular season

Schedule

Standings

y – clinched regular-season title

x – clinched playoff spot

Playoffs

Roster

Awards

References

External links
 1989 Denver Dynamite page at ArenaFan.com

Denver Dynamite
Denver Dynamite
Denver Dynamite (arena football) seasons